1954 Colombo Cup was the third edition of the Colombo Cup held in Calcutta, India. India won the tournament for a third time.

Points Tables
(C) refers to Champions

Matches
All the results are based on data from

Reference

Colombo Cup
1954 in Ceylon